Hypericum assamicum is a species of flowering plant in the St. John's wort family, Hypericaceae. It is endemic to India. Hypericum assamicum is one of two species of Hypericum in the section Hypericum sect. Sampsonia.

Description
The stems are terete with internodes , shorter than or exceeding the leaves. The margin of the leaf is entire, or rarely glandular-crenate, with dense, black glands. The leaves have broadly cuneate or rounded leaf bases. The flowerheads produce 12–18 flowers in corymbiform or subpyramidal branching patterns. It flowers and fruits between March and April.

Taxonomy
Hypericum assamicum was described in 1971 by Samarendra Nath Biswas in Webbia, Journal of Plant Taxonomy and Geography. The type specimen was collected in Nowgong (now Nagaon), Assam, India in July 1848. It was named for its type locality, Assam, India.

It is placed in the section Hypericum sect. Sampsonia, along with Hypericum sampsonii, based on the combination of perfoliate leaves and vesicular-glandular capsule valves. Hypericum assamicum is distinguished from H. sampsonii by its leaves that are shortly connate-perfoliate at the base (vs. broadly perfoliate bases), spatulate-oblong unequal sepals (vs. oblong subequal sepals), petals shorter than the sepals (vs. petals as long as the sepals), ovaries with 3-parietal placentas (vs. 3-celled with an axile placenta), and subglobose to oblong capsules with rounded or obtuse apices (vs. ovoid capsules with narrowed to acute apices).

Distribution and habitat
Hypericum assamicum is endemic to eastern India. A 1915 collection noted that it was "common in jungles".

References

assamicum
Flora of Assam (region)
Plants described in 1971